Krstevski or Krsteski is a common Macedonian surname. Notable people with the surname include:

Bojan Krstevski (born 1989), Macedonian basketball player
Darko Krsteski (born 1971), Macedonian footballer
Goran Krstevski (born 1996), Macedonian handball player
Ilija Krstevski (born 1993), Macedonian handball player

Macedonian-language surnames